Wilburn Glynn Griffing (born December 1, 1940 in Bentonia, Mississippi) is a former American football quarterback who played one season for the New York Giants in the National Football League.  He played college football at the University of Mississippi and was drafted in the fourth round of the 1962 NFL Draft.  Griffing was also selected in the fourteenth round of the 1962 AFL Draft by the Houston Oilers.

External links
 Stats at databasefootball.com

1940 births
Living people
People from Bentonia, Mississippi
American football quarterbacks
Ole Miss Rebels football players
New York Giants players